Eye Benches I, II and III is a 1996–1997 series of outdoor sculptures by Louise Bourgeois, installed at Olympic Sculpture Park in Seattle, Washington. The installation includes three sets of two functional benches. The sets are individually known as Eye Benches I, Eye Benches II, and Eye Benches III.

See also
 1997 in art
 List of artworks by Louise Bourgeois

References

External links

 
 

1997 sculptures
Olympic Sculpture Park
Works by Louise Bourgeois